The TRU WolfPack are the athletic teams that represent Thompson Rivers University in Kamloops, British Columbia, Canada. They were known as the UCC Sun Demons prior to the creation of the university in 2005.

Teams 
WolfPack Varsity Clubs:
 Basketball (Men's & Women's)
 Cross-Country Running 
 Soccer (Men's & Women's
 Swimming 
 Volleyball (Men's & Women's 
All compete in the Canada West Universities Athletic Association, which is a member U Sports — formerly known as Canadian Interuniversity Sport.

Wolfpack Club Sports:
 Baseball
 Cheerleading (Co-ed)
 Team Orange - Collegiate School Advanced (Level 4)
 Team Black - Collegiate University Premier (Level 7)
 Women's Rugby (7's) ** Cancelled effective April 2019 

The baseball team competes in the Canadian College Baseball Conference.

Wolfpack Cheerleading competed at Collegiate School Advanced (Level 4), Team Orange, until 2018-19 when they added Team Black to compete at Collegiate University Premier (Level 7).
Wolfpack cheerleading is a member of the BC Cheerleading Association

Affiliation 
The WolfPack became an official member of the Canada West Universities Athletic Association on May 6, 2010.

Accomplishments 

Soccer 
 The Wolfpack men's soccer team placed third in the U-Sports National Championship in 2017. In 2018 they placed third in Canada West Playoffs.

Baseball
 The WolfPack baseball team won the Canadian College Baseball Conference championship in 2005, 2007 and 2009.

Basketball
 The WolfPack men's basketball team made it to the CIS Final 8 in 2015–16. They won a silver medal in Canada West in 2016.

Cheerleading
 The Wolfpack Cheerleading teams both placed first at the annual 2019 True North Cheerleading competition held in Edmonton, Alberta. Team Black also received a Full Bid and Team Orange received an At-large Bid to the 2020 University World Cup Cheerleading Championships to be held at the Walt Disney World Resort.
Volleyball
 WolfPack women's volleyball player Iuliia Pakhomenko was named the Canada West and CIS player of the year in 2016. She was also a Canada West finalist for the BLG Award, which goes to the outstanding university athlete in Canada.
 WolfPack women's volleyball players outside hitter Olga Savenchuk (Donetsk, Ukraine) was named to the 2019 Canada West first all-star team and middle Hayley McNaught (Woking, AB) was named to the 2019 Canada West rookie all-star teams.

References

External links
 

U Sports teams
WolfPack, TRU
Sport in Kamloops